Ambient Guitar Noise: Volume 1 is the debut studio album of ambient, experimental guitar loop compositions by Matthew McCabe in a first recording as King Never. Recorded live in the studio over the course of one week, the album was released by Marathon Records on June 1, 2000

Background 

Influenced by 80s new wave and progressive rock such as The Police, King Crimson, and The Fixx, King Never originally began as an outlet for Matt McCabe's explorations on guitar with real-time audio feedback techniques. The album was recorded live in studio with no overdubs.

Track listing 

 Handshake – :24
 Loop 2 – 4:51
 Loop 3 – 4:35
 Loop 4 – 2:10
 Loop 5 – 3:07
 Loop 6 – 5:29
 Loop 7 – 5:16
 Loop 8 – 7:31
 Loop 9 – 2:27
 End Loop – 5:36

Production notes 

 Matt McCabe: Guitar 
 Mixed at Back Room Studios, Chico, CA on April 27, 1996 by Loren Alldrin and Matt McCabe
 Mastered at [Finley Sound], Roseville, CA from May 27 to May 29, 2000 by Matt McCabe.
 Produced by Matt McCabe
 Art direction and design by Jeff Elbel
 Photography by Matt McCabe

References

External links 
 album info on KingNever.com
 Allmusic.com - Ambient Guitar Noise: Volume 1 

Ambient Guitar Noise: Volume 1
King Never albums